Man with a Red Hat is a tempera on panel painting attributed to Italian Renaissance painter Vittore Carpaccio, created around 1490–1493. It is housed in the Museo Correr in Venice.

Description
The attribution to Carpaccio is disputed: the names of  Bartolomeo Montagna and Lorenzo Lotto have been also proposed, while others assign it to an unknown master from Ferrara or Bologna. The dating is less controversial, having been assigned to the early 1490s, when Carpaccio was painting the Legend of Saint Ursula  and other cycles in Venice, and personal portraits of noblemen were becoming common.

The painting depicts an unknown man's face and (partially) bust, above a landscape background. The latter includes a lake, a portion of countryside and mountains, partially hidden by a far haze.

Sources

1490s paintings
Paintings by Vittore Carpaccio
Collections of the Museo Correr